Samuel de Champlain (1574–1635) was a French explorer.

Champlain may also refer to:

People
Jacques de Champlain (1938–2009), Canadian scientist, doctor and professor 
Marshall B. Champlain (1822–1879), American lawyer and politician
Champlain Marcil (1920–2010), Canadian photojournalist

Places
Champlain Sea, temporary inlet of the Atlantic Ocean
Champlain Valley, region of the United States around Lake Champlain 
Lake Champlain, natural freshwater lake in North America

Canada
Champlain (electoral district), a Canadian federal electoral district in Quebec dissolved in 1982
Champlain (Province of Canada electoral district), a district in the pre-Confederation Province of Canada
Champlain (provincial electoral district), a Quebec provincial electoral district
 Champlain (Lower Canada), former district in Canada
Champlain, Ontario, a township in eastern Ontario
Champlain, Quebec, a town on north shore of the Saint Lawrence River
Champlain Heights, a neighbourhood in the city of Vancouver, British Columbia, Canada
Champlain Regional County Municipality, a RCM of Quebec, amalgamated into the expanded city of Longueuil in 2001
Champlain River, a tributary of the Saint Lawrence River in Quebec
Lordship of Champlain, granted in 1664, on the north side of the St. Lawrence River between Trois-Rivières and Quebec City
 Champlain Trail Lakes, a group of lakes on the southern point of Whitewater Region in Ontario
Petit Champlain, a small commercial zone in Quebec City, Quebec, Canada

United States
 Champlain Clay, a geologic formation in Maine
Champlain, New York
Champlain (village), New York
 Champlain, Virginia, an unincorporated community in Essex County, Virginia
Champlain II (wrecksite), a sidewheel steamer shipwreck archaeological site located in Lake Champlain near Westport in Essex County, New York

Facilities and structures
Champlain Bridge (disambiguation)
Champlain Arsenal, a 19th-century fortification near Vergennes, Vermont, USA
Château Champlain, a historic hotel located in Montreal, Quebec, Canada
Hotel Champlain, a historic hotel building located in Plattsburgh, New York, USA 
Champlain Apartment Building, listed on the National Register of Historic Places in Washington, D.C., USA
Mail Champlain, in Brossard, Quebec, Canada
Champlain Place, a shopping centre located in Dieppe, New Brunswick, Canada
Champlain Towers South, Champlain Towers, Surfside, Miami-Dade, Florida, USA; a condominium-apartment building which collapsed in 2021

Schools
Champlain College (disambiguation), several educational establishments
École Secondaire Catholique Champlain, French Catholic school in Chelmsford, Ontario
Champlain School, a historic former school building at 809 Pine Street in the South End of Burlington, Vermont

Ships
Le Champlain, the second ship of the Ponant Explorers-class of cruise ships
MV Champlain, an Empire F type coaster in service with R & D Desgagnes, Quebec
SS Champlain, a French cabin class ocean liner built in 1932 
HMCS Champlain, Several Canadian naval units
USS Lake Champlain, one of three ships of the United States Navy
SS Lake Champlain, 19th century Canadian iron screw-steamer
Champlain II, a sidewheel steamer wrecked in Lake Champlain near Westport in Essex County, New York, USA; the shipwreck now turned into an NRHP archaeological site
Samuel de Champlain (tugboat), a US-flagged tugboat.

Other uses
Champlain Housing Trust, a membership-based nonprofit, non governmental organization 
Champlain Society, Canadian text publication society
Battle of Lake Champlain (1814) at Plattsburgh
Battle of Lake Champlain (1776) at Valcour Bay

See also 

French-language surnames